The Lysistrata Project is a contemporary re-working or adaptation for radio of Aristophanes's play Lysistrata, developed with the help of young people living and studying in London, UK. First broadcast 28 May 2006 on BBC Radio 3 with the following cast, directed by Marc Beeby:

Lacy ...... Ayesha Antoine
Lucas ...... Javone Prince
Mike ...... Mohammed George
Kelly ...... Gbemisola Ikumelo
Colin ...... Carl Prekopp
Maria/Tanya ...... Claire Louise Cordwell
Jake/Dave ...... Mark Monero

BBC Radio 3 programmes
Works based on Lysistrata